Priolepis robinsi is a species of goby native to the Atlantic Ocean off of Santa Marta, Colombia. The specific name honours the American ichthyologist C. Richard Robins (1928-2020) who was at the University of Miami where he studied neotropical gobies.

References

robinsi
Fish of Colombia
Near threatened animals
Endemic fauna of Colombia
Fish described in 1991
Taxonomy articles created by Polbot